"Street Dancer" is a song by Swedish house producer and DJ Avicii. It was released on 17 January 2011 in South Africa, 26 February 2011 in the Netherlands, 29 March 2011 in the US, and on 5 June 2011 in the UK. It was written by Avicii and samples the Break Machine's 1983 breakdance hit "Street Dance".

Track listing

Charts

Release history

References

2011 singles
Avicii songs
Song recordings produced by Avicii
Universal Music Group singles